Clavulinopsis is a genus of foraminifera from the Upper Cretaceous of the United States (Texas, Arkansas), included in the Textulariida. The type species is Clavulinopsis hofkeri Banner and Desai, 1985.

Clavulinopsis has a free aggulinated test with a considerable calcareous groundmass. The early stage is triserial, later abruptly becoming uniserial; cross section triangular. Sutures are slightly depressed, horizontal to slightly arched at the center of the flattened sides. Lateral walls are filled with fine micro-tubular cavities (term: canaliculate) that open into the chamber interiors, but are sealed externally by a finely agglutinated outer layer. Septa are solid, without micro-tubular cavities. The aperture is cribrate, with irregular pores at the end of a slightly produced neck.

References 

 Loeblich and Tappan, 1988, 
 Pseudogaudryinidae in Foraminiferal genera and their classification

Globothalamea
Prehistoric Foraminifera genera
Campanian genus first appearances
Maastrichtian genus extinctions